Verdugo Hills Council (VHC) is one of five Boy Scouts of America councils in Los Angeles County, California. Headquartered in Glendale. It was founded in 1920 as the Glendale Council, changing its name in 1922 to the Verdugo Hills Council (#058).

Organization

Tongva District

Camps

Camp Verdugo Oaks
Camp Silver Fir - Huntington Lake CA

Order of the Arrow

Spe-Le-Yai Lodge #249

See also
Scouting in California

References

Boy Scout councils in California
Glendale, California
Organizations based in Los Angeles County, California
1920 establishments in California